Leo Elthon (June 9, 1898 – April 16, 1967) was the 32nd Governor of Iowa from November 21, 1954 to January 13, 1955. Elthon had been elected the Lieutenant Governor of Iowa in November 1952, and filled the unexpired term of Governor William S. Beardsley, who died in office.

Biography
Elthon attended the Augsburg Seminary, Iowa State University, and Hamilton College (Iowa).  He became a schoolteacher and school principal.  From 1932 until his election as lieutenant governor in 1952, he was a member of the Iowa Senate.  After leaving office as governor, he returned to his duties as lieutenant governor until 1957.  He then served as mayor of Fertile, Iowa (1958–63) and again in the state Senate (1963–65).  He is interred at the Brushpoint cemetery in his hometown of Fertile, Iowa.

References

  National Governors Association biography

1898 births
1967 deaths
Republican Party Iowa state senators
Lieutenant Governors of Iowa
Republican Party governors of Iowa
People from Worth County, Iowa
Augsburg University alumni
Iowa State University alumni
Mayors of places in Iowa
Burials in Iowa
20th-century American politicians